Native Design is a British design and innovation company.  Native design is used by companies and institutions such as: ABinBev, Audi, Bang & Olufsen, Baxter, BBC, Bentley, Bowers & Wilkins, Canal Plus, Coloplast, Diageo, Ford, Here, HP, Illumina, Microsoft, Nespresso, Novo Nordisk, Pernod Ricard, SFR, Skype, Santander and Veon.

The company works in the areas of automotive and consumer electronics, telecommunications and healthcare. The company is based in London and San Francisco and consists of more than 200 employees.

History and work 
Native Design was founded in 1997 by former Manager of Design at Bowers & Wilkins, Morten Villiers Warren. Morten designed the "Emphasis Speakers" on the cover of Art of Noise's Below the Waste album.

After the success of their early work, the company developed a long-standing relationship and collaboration with Bowers & Wilkins, designing earphones the Zeppelin iPod dock and loudspeaker and the PM1 loudspeaker.

Working with the HP Design Team in 2014, Native created the Sprout, a touch screen computer with both vertical and horizontal screens, which "aims to help designers move between physical and digital platforms seamlessly". 
In 2015, HP's CEO Meg Whitman called for a unification across HP's GBUs and thus kick-started concept visioning with Native.

Native was commissioned to create the new user experience (UX) and homepage for the BBC in 2015.

Coloplast employed Native to create the "Design DNA" in 2016, which won a Gold Lion at the Cannes Lions Festival of Creativity. Subsequently, Forbes named the company as one of the "Top 25 Most Innovative Companies of 2016".

Native was recently honored with the International Design Excellence Gold Award for its work with the Ford Motor Company on the creation of their future car experience known as the Autonomous Vehicle Simulator (AVS). AVS is a demonstration platform. The work generated hundreds of new patents for Ford.

Awards and recognition 
The company was the first British design company to win both Gold and Best in Show at the IDSA International Design Excellence Awards (IDEA).

 Gold at the IDSA International Design Excellence Awards for the Definitive Autonomous Car Experience for Ford Motor Company
Gold at the IDSA International Design Excellence Awards for the Zeppelin iPod dock and loudspeaker for Bowers & Wilkins.
 Gold and Best in Show at the IDSA International Design Excellence Awards for the Design DNA for healthcare company Coloplast.
 Gold at the Cannes Festival of Creativity for the Design DNA for Coloplast. 
 5 Red Dot Awards for the HP PHI Design Language Strategy.

References 

Design companies established in 1997
Online companies of the United Kingdom
Product designers
Interface designers
Companies based in the London Borough of Hackney
British companies established in 1997
Design companies of the United Kingdom